Marios Varvoglis (Greek: Μάριος Βάρβογλης; 10 December 1885 – 30 July 1967) was a Greek composer.

Varvoglis was born in Brussels. He studied music at the Conservatoire de Paris and the Schola Cantorum with Leroux, Georges Caussade, d'Indy and others. He remained in Montparnasse, Paris until 1922 and he maintained close relations with artistic circles that included Casella, Ravel, Varèse and Modigliani, whose last painting was a portrait of Varvoglis. After 1920 he taught at the Athens Conservatory and he became active as a music critic and conductor. He was persecuted for his liberal political views and he was imprisoned in a British concentration camp during the Dekemvriana

He died in Athens.

Music

Varvoglis' music belongs to the Greek national school, but was also influenced by the French style. His works include:

Stage
St. Barbara (1912)
The Afternoon of Love (1944)
Long live Messolonghi, for solo English horn and strings (1933)

Incidental music
Agamemnon (Aeschylus; 1932)
The Persians (Aeschylus; 1934)
The Birds (Aristophanes; 1942)
Medea (Euripides; 1942)
The Oath of the Dead (Zacharias Papantoniou; 1938)

Orchestral works
The Feast (1906–9)
Pastoral suite for strings (1912)
Capriccio (1914)
Canon, Chorale and Fugue on BACH (1930)
Prelude, Chorale and Fugue on BACH (1937)
Meditation for strings (1938)
Laurels and Cypresses (1950)
Symphonic poem Behind the Barbed Wire Fence (1945)

Chamber
Doll's Serenade (1905)
Pastoral Suite (1912)
Hommage a César Franck (violin and piano; 1922)
Trio for strings (1938)
Piano Trio (1943)
Prelude and Fugue on a Byzantine Theme (1953)

Piano
Children's Hour, 14 pieces (1930)
Greek Rhapsody (1922)
Sonatina (1927)

Other
songs

References

The New Grove Dictionary of Music and Musicians

1885 births
1967 deaths
Greek classical composers
Greek classical musicians
Greek conductors (music)
Male classical composers
20th-century conductors (music)
20th-century male musicians
19th-century Greek musicians
20th-century Greek musicians
Greek National School
Musicians from Athens
Emigrants from Belgium to Greece